The 2015–16 Elon Phoenix women's basketball team represents Elon University during the 2015–16 NCAA Division I women's basketball season. The Phoenix, led by fifth year head coach Charlotte Smith, play their home games at Alumni Gym and were second year members of the Colonial Athletic Association. They finished the season 18–13, 11–7 in CAA play finish in fourth place. They lost in the quarterfinals of the CAA women's tournament to Delaware. They were invited to the Women's National Invitational Tournament where they lost to Virginia Tech in the first round.

Roster

Schedule

|-
!colspan=9 style="background:#910028; color:#CDB87D;"| Exhibition

|-
!colspan=9 style="background:#910028; color:#CDB87D;"| Non-conference regular season

|-
!colspan=9 style="background:#910028; color:#CDB87D;"| CAA regular season

|-
!colspan=9 style="background:#910028; color:#CDB87D;"| CAA Women's Tournament

|-
!colspan=9 style="background:#910028; color:#CDB87D;"| WNIT

See also 
2015–16 Elon Phoenix men's basketball team

References 

Elon Phoenix women's basketball seasons
Elon
2016 Women's National Invitation Tournament participants